Arcana Unearthed (properly Monte Cook's Arcana Unearthed), first published in 2003, is a role-playing game created by Monte Cook.  Described as a "variant player's handbook", the 256-page hardcover core rulebook bears many similarities to the Player's Handbook of 3rd Edition Dungeons & Dragons, on which Cook worked a few years prior.  Arcana Unearthed is based on the d20 system of Dungeons & Dragons, but because of the rules for character advancement, it cannot be an official d20 system product. It uses the Open Gaming License.

Development
Arcana Unearthed (2003) was advertised as a "variant player's handbook" with an alternative system of d20 rules taking place in Monte Cook's setting known as "The Diamond Throne," a world controlled by giants, which was later revised as Arcana Evolved (2005).

Themes
Two of the most important themes of the game are ritual and character choices. Two examples are metamorphosis, in which faen become tiny, winged sprytes, and Chi-Julud, in which the wise giants temporarily lose their wisdom to become stronger and more warlike. Monte Cook emphasized that players should avoid archetypes (presumably referring to the character archetypes of Dungeons & Dragons) and design their characters more creatively.

Setting
The campaign setting for Arcana Unearthed is the lands of The Diamond Throne, a land ruled by giants.  The setting includes many elements of a traditional fantasy setting, along with a focus on ritual and ceremony, runes, and the magical properties of crystals.

Title confusion
Arcana Unearthed is not to be confused with Unearthed Arcana, the title of two books published in 1985 and 2004 that provided additional material for use in the then-current version of Dungeons & Dragons. The name Arcana Unearthed was chosen partially as a homage to the earlier of these two books. The announcement of the 2004 version came as an unpleasant surprise to Cook and some of his fans, who believed that they had an understanding with Wizards of the Coast that this title would not be re-used in the near future.

Reception
Arcana Unearthed won the 2004 Gold ENnie Award for Best Game, and the Silver for Best Art (Cover).

The cover, by artist Mark Zug, won the Chesley Award for Best Gaming-Related Illustration in 2005.

Arcana Evolved
Arcana Evolved is an updated "director's cut" of Arcana Unearthed released in 2005. Arcana Evolved is 432 pages in full color. It adds the contents of two previously separate books, The Diamond Throne and the Player's Companion, to the original variant player's handbook, along with new material including a new class and race, many new feats and spells, and rules for higher level characters than were possible in the original book. On the less mechanical side, it also advances the time line of the Diamond Throne campaign setting by several years - years which feature the return of dragons to the lands of the Diamond Throne, reviving an ancient rivalry with the ruling giants.

Arcana Evolved won the 2005 Gold Ennie Award for "Best Interior Art".

Additional books 
Malhavoc Press have expanded the Arcana Unearthed universe with a series of books, including the rulebooks The Diamond Throne, Legacy of Dragons, Grimoire II, and Mystic Secrets, and the short story collection Children of the Rune. Some other publishers, including Blue Devil Games, have also supported the Arcana Unearthed line. Since the release of Arcana Evolved, Malhavoc has released a number of supporting books specific to the new edition, such as the Spell Treasury, Transcendence and Ruins of Intrigue.

Sue Weinlein Cook edited the 2004 short story collection Children of the Rune.

References

External links
 Arcana Evolved Products at Malhavoc Press.
 Review of Arcana Evolved at Enworld.
 d20 Magazine Rack has 3 staff reviews of Arcana Evolved:
 Review by Bruce Boughner
 Review by Chris Sims, also known as Khur
 Review by Ian Hewitt

D20 System publications
ENnies winners
Fantasy role-playing games
Role-playing games introduced in 2003